The Zimbabwean passport is issued to citizens of Zimbabwe primarily for international travel. It can also be used for identification in lieu of national registration card or drivers licence. It is the primary proof for citizenship which can be verified through the Registrar General's office in the Ministry of Home Affairs.

On 15 December 2021, the Zimbabwean government launched the new e-passport in order to meet modern international standards.

Country Code Errors

The country code in some Zimbabwean passports were not printed in accordance with the ISO code for Zimbabwe. The country code in these passports is listed as ZIM when it should otherwise be ZWE; this has led to frustrating encounters for Zimbabweans with airline, immigration, and border control officials. This error has often led to officials suspecting such passports to be fake. When the passport's MRZ is scanned, the immigration and checking systems fail to recognise the country code ZIM. Airlines have issued circulars to their staff and published information on their websites highlighting this issue.

Visa requirements

, Zimbabwean citizens had visa-free or visa on arrival access to 59 countries and territories, ranking the Zimbabwean passport 77th in terms of travel freedom (tied Ghanaian passport) according to the Henley visa restrictions index.

See also 

 Rhodesian passport (used before 1980)
 Visa requirements for Zimbabwean citizens
 Visa policy of Zimbabwe

References

Foreign relations of Zimbabwe
Zimbabwe
Government of Zimbabwe
Zimbabwe and the Commonwealth of Nations